The Al Rose Formation is a geologic formation in California. It consists mostly of siltstone, mudstone and shale, with some chert and occasional limestone. In it are found graptolite and trilobite fossils dating back to the Ordovician period.

See also

 List of fossiliferous stratigraphic units in California
 Paleontology in Nevada

References

Ordovician geology of California
Ordovician California
Ordovician southern paleotropical deposits